Kirk J. Schneider is a psychologist and psychotherapist who has taken a leading role in the advancement of existential-humanistic therapy, and existential-integrative therapy. Schneider is also the current editor of the Journal of Humanistic Psychology.  His major books are Existential-Humanistic Therapy (2010), Existential-Integrative Therapy (2008), The Handbook of Humanistic Psychology (with James Bugental and Fraser Pierson) (2001), The Psychology of Existence (with Rollo May)(1995), Rediscovery of Awe (2004),  Awakening to Awe (2009), and "The Polarized Mind" (2013).

He worked closely with existential and humanistic psychology pioneer Rollo May, and in 2004, was himself the recipient of the Rollo May Award from Division 32 of the American Psychological Association for “outstanding and independent pursuit of new frontiers in humanistic psychology.”  He has been integral in fostering global dialogs surrounding existential themes in psychology, and in April 2010, he delivered the opening keynote address at the First (East-West) International Existential Psychology Conference in Nanjing, China.  He is also a Fellow of three Divisions of the American Psychological Association (Humanistic, Clinical, and Independent Practice) and has published over 100 articles and chapters and has authored or edited eight books.  He is currently vice-president of the Existential-Humanistic Institute (EHI), adjunct faculty at Saybrook University,  Teachers College, Columbia University, and the California Institute of Integral Studies, and contributor to Psychology Today.

Summary of main works

With the advent of Existential-Integrative Psychotherapy, Schneider expanded the traditional focus of existential therapy on depth exploration to include other, more mainstream treatment modalities. By the same token, he broadened mainstream treatment modalities with the ever-present availability of depth exploration. Existential-Integrative therapy is a "deeply relational approach which uses a range of therapeutic concepts and strategies to help clients engage more fully with their experiencing". Schneider discussed freedom at the level of psychosexuality and how it entails the integration of one's sexual-aggressive past. According to Schneider, liberation at this level strengthens one's ego. Another form of freedom he discussed is that at the level of interpersonal relations and how it acknowledges and transcends freedom at the level of psychosexual relations. He says that at the interpersonal level, freedom balances individual striving and uniqueness with interpersonal dependence and connectedness. He coined the term 'experiential freedom' saying that it "embraces not only physiology, environmental conditioning, cognition, psychosexuality, and interpersonal relations, but also cosmic or intersituational relations". Schneider begins by defining and describing “awe,” a most important attitude and state of being, which has become much less central to our lives in these times. Awe is a fluid attitude, which incorporates wonder, dread, mystery, veneration, and the embracing of paradox. Cultivating awe as central in our consciousness requires that we move away from many of the values with which we are continually confronted: consumerism, conventionality, competitiveness, and mindless entertainment. An awe inspired life also counters all sorts of dogmatic beliefs and convictions, be they fundamentally religious or rigidly atheistic.
 
With Rediscovery of Awe and Awakening to Awe, Schneider drew upon the rich heritage of existential-spiritual philosophy as elaborated by such thinkers as Paul Tillich, Martin Buber, Abraham Heschel, Søren Kierkegaard, and William James as well as his own clinical and personal observations to cultivate an "awe-based" approach to psychology and life. By "awe-based," Schneider means the sense of humility and wonder or adventure one experiences simply by living. While the sense of awe may be inherent to living it also must be cultivated periodically, lest it be crushed by our "quick fix," efficiency oriented culture; or by political or religious dogma. In Rediscovery of Awe, Schneider set forth the principles of an awe-based psychology as well as applications of those principles to concrete spheres of life, such as the educational setting, the work setting, and the ethical-spiritual setting. In "Awakening to Awe," Schneider focused specifically on how the sense of awe radically transformed seven lives. Among the people he investigated were a former gang member who became a gang mediator, an ex drug addict who became a case worker and Yoga instructor, and a survivor of stage-three cancer. Finally, in Existential-Integrative Psychotherapy, Schneider showed how the humility and wonder cultivated in good therapy can inspire the humility and wonder, or, in short awe, that can be nurtured outside of good therapy. In his most recent book, "The polarized mind: Why it's killing us and what we can do about it,"  (2013), Schneider shows how the sense of awe and encounter with life's mystery can be an antidote to destructive and totalitarian cultures as well as individuals.

In his works he took the approach of humanistic psychologists. In this field of psychology, Schneider credits Abe Maslow for being an influential figure in his early years in the field of psychology. He acknowledges that his humanistic perceptions were awakened by Maslow's works. He believed that Maslow implied that our healing comes from our "restoration of awe, the attunement to a larger picture of life". He was a proponent for spiritual healing and trying to attain fulfillment. He uses the theory of awe as a therapeutic method in enlivening lives.

Publications

Books
Schneider, K.J. (1990/1999, 2nd paperback ed.).  The paradoxical self:  Toward an understanding of our contradictory nature.  Buffalo, NY:  Prometheus Press/ Humanity Books.  (Originally published by Plenum/Insight.) [Translated into Portuguese and Slovakian; currently being translated into Chinese Short Form]. [All books to follow are currently being translated into Chinese Short Form]
Schneider, K.J.  (1993).  Horror and the holy:  Wisdom-teachings of the monster tale.  Chicago:  Open Court.
Schneider, K.J., & May, R.  (1995).  The psychology of existence:  An integrative, clinical perspective.  New York:  McGraw-Hill. [Translated in 2010 into Chinese Short Form, Chinese People's University Press]
Schneider, K.J., Bugental, J.F.T., & Pierson, J.F. (2001).  The handbook of humanistic psychology:  Leading edges in theory, research, and practice.  Thousand Oaks:  Sage. (Reprinted in paperback, August, 2002). The second edition of "The handbook" was published in 2015.
Schneider, K.J. (2004).  Rediscovery of awe: Splendor, mystery, and the fluid center of life.  St. Paul, MN:  Paragon House.
Schneider, K.J. (2008).  Existential-integrative psychotherapy: Guideposts to the core of practice.  New York:  Routledge.
Schneider, K.J. (2009).  Awakening to Awe: Personal stories of profound transformation. Lanham, MD:  Jason Aronson.
Schneider, K.J., & Krug, O.T. (2010/2017).  Existential-Humanistic Therapy.  Washington, DC: American Psychological Association Press (Theories of Psychotherapy Series). A second edition was published in 2017. 
Schneider, K.J. (2013).  "The polarized mind: Why it's killing us and what we can do about it." Colorado Springs, CO:  University Professors Press.
Krug, O., & Schneider, K.J. " (2016).  "Supervision essentials for existential-humanistic therapy.  Washington, DC: American Psychological Association Press (Clinical Supervision Essentials series).
Schneider, K.J. (2017/2019).  "The spirituality of awe: Challenges to the robotic revolution."  Cardiff, CA:  Waterfront Digital Press. Revised edition 2019 by University Professors Press.
Schneider, K.J. (2020).  "The depolarizing of America:  A guidebook for social healing." University Professors Press.

Magazine articles
Price, M. (2011, November). Searching for Meaning. Monitor on Psychology. American Psychological Association. http://www.apa.org/monitor/2011/11/meaning.aspx.
Schneider, K.J. (2003, July/August).  Enchanted agnosticism.  Tikkun Magazine, 39–41.
Schneider, K.J.  (2005,September).  Through the lens of awe. Spirituality and health.
Schneider, K.J. (2005, September–November).  Awe-based Learning.  Institute for Noetic Sciences Shift Magazine.
Schneider, K.J. (2008, January–February).  Awe-based work.  Tikkun Magazine, 20–21.
Schneider, K.J. (2009, November–December).  The awe-based challenge to positive psychology. Tikkun Magazine, 30–32, 73.
Schneider, K.J. (2010, Sept.).  The case for existential therapy.  Psychology Today. Online at http://www.psychologytoday.com/search/query?keys=kirk+schneider&x=0&y=0
Schneider, K.J. (2010, December).  Toward a humanistic positive psychology. Psychology Today.  Online at http://www.psychologytoday.com/search/query?keys=kirk+schneider&x=0&y=0
Schneider, K.J.  (2011, Winter).    25th Anniversary Commentary.  Tikkun Magazine, online at tikkun.org.

Online and media resources
Schneider, K.J. (2006).  Existential Psychotherapy.  American Psychological Association Video Series:  Systems of Psychotherapy I.  Washington, DC:  American Psychological Association.  (Available at www.apa.org/videos).
May, R. (2007). (Speaker). Rollo May on existential psychotherapy. [DVD.] Psychotherapy.net (Available online at http://www.psychotherapy.net), San Francisco, CA. Interviewed by Kirk Schneider, John Galvin, and Ilene Serlin.
Schneider, K.J. (2008, December).  The Mystery of Being.  TV Ontario Big Ideas Series. [Available at youtube.com]
Schneider, K.J. (2009).  Existential-Humanistic Therapy. .  American Psychological Association Video Series:  Psychotherapy Over Time [6 session format]. Washington, DC:  American Psychological Association.  (Available at www.apa.org/videos).

References

External links 
 Official website

Living people
21st-century American psychologists
American psychotherapists
Year of birth missing (living people)